Paul Shapiro is the name of:

 Paul Shapiro (author) (born 1979), American animal activist
 Paul Shapiro (artist) (born 1939), American Abstract Expressionist and landscape painter
 Paul Shapiro (director) (born 1955), Canadian film and television director
 Paul Shapiro (musician), American Klezmer musician
 Paul A. Shapiro, American Holocaust historian
 Paul R. Shapiro, American astrophysicist